= La Trace de Kandia =

2014 Franco-Guinean drama film

- Directed by: Laurent Chevallier
- Written by: Laurent Chevallier
- Production company: Caméra One Télévision
- Release date: 10 November 2014 (France)
- Running time: 75 minutes
- Countries: France; Guinea
- Language: French

La Trace de Kandia is a 2014 Franco-Guinean documentary film directed by Laurent Chevallier. The film reveals the story of Guinean singer Ibrahima Sory Kouyaté, who is also known as the Kandia or the Golden Voice of Manding. He is also the first iconic singer of independent Africa. The film received positive reviews from critics.
